Cassius Apronianus was a Roman senator who lived in the 2nd century. It has been conjectured that he supposedly married the daughter of the Greek historian, orator, and philosopher Dio Chrysostom. Their son was the historian, consul and senator Cassius Dio.

Apronianus was originally from Bithynia (modern northwestern Turkey). He was governor of Lycia et Pamphylia around 179/180, then of Cilicia (modern southeastern Turkey) c. 180 - c. 183, where he was joined by his son Dio. Apronianus became suffect consul most likely around 185, after which he served as governor of Dalmatia (modern Dalmatia, Croatia).

References

Sources 

2nd-century Romans
Apronianus
Roman governors of Cilicia
Roman governors of Dalmatia
Roman governors of Lycia et Pamphylia
Suffect consuls of Imperial Rome
Year of birth unknown
Year of death unknown